Fengqiu County is a county in the north of Henan province, located on the north (left) bank of the Yellow River. It is under the administration of the prefecture-level city of Xinxiang.

In ancient times, Pingqiu County was located to the east of here.

Administrative divisions
As 2012, this county is divided to 8 towns and 11 townships.
Towns

Townships

Climate

See also
Mao Jie

References

County-level divisions of Henan
Xinxiang